Ablepharus eremchenkoi is a species of skink, a lizard in the family Scincidae. The species is native to Kazakhstan and Kyrgyzstan.

Etymology
The specific name, eremchenkoi, is in honor of Russian herpetologist Valery Konstantinovich Eremchenko (also published as Jeremčenko).

Geographic range
A. eremchenkoi is found in southern Kazakhstan and northwestern Kyrgyzstan.

Habitat

References

Further reading
Mirza ZA, Bragin AM, Bhosale H, Gowande GG, Patel H, Poyarkov NA (2022). "A new ancient lineage of ablepharine skinks (Sauria: Scincidae) from eastern Himalayas with notes on origin and systematics of the group". PeerJ 10: e12800. (Ablepharus eremchenkoi, new combination).
Panfilov AM (1999). "Mejpopyliatsionnie otioshenniia i vidovaia prinadkejnosty gornykh ligozomiykh kompleksa Asymblepharus alaicus Severo-Zapadnogo i Vnutrennego Tian-Shannia". Izvestija nacional'noj Akademii Nauk Kyrghyzskoj Respubliki 1: 51–55. (Asymblepharus eremchenkoi, new species). (in Russian).
Sindaco R, Jeremčenko VK (2008). Reptiles of the Western Palearctic. 1. Annotated Checklist and Distributional Atlas of the Turtles, Crocodiles, Amphisbaenians and Lizards of Europe, North Africa, Middle East and Central Asia. (Monographs of the Societas Herpetologica Italica). Latina, Italy: Edizioni Belvedere. 580 pp. . (Asymblepharus eremchenkoi).

Ablepharus
Reptiles described in 1999
Taxa named by Alexander M. Panfilov